A 'Human Rights Code is a type of law defining minimum human rights in a political jurisdiction, and may refer to:

 Human Rights Code (British Columbia)
 Human Rights Code (Ontario)